Melissa 'The Missile' Giove (born 1972) is an American professional downhill mountain biker.  Throughout her career she won 14 NORBA downhill titles and 11 world cups. Giove's other accomplishments include three overall NORBA downhill crowns, two World Cup overalls, and the 1994 World Championship title.

Career

Giove was born in Manhattan, NY. She raced for Yeti Cycles, along with other racers: Myles Rockwell, Jimmy Deaton, John Tomac and Johnny O'Mara, managed by former owner of Yeti Cycles, John Parker, the Volvo-Cannondale USA cycling team.

Giove raced wearing the desiccated body of her deceased pet piranha, Gonzo, around her neck, which would become a marketing campaign for Cannondale.

2015, Giove qualified 17th at the World Cup Downhill race at Windham, New York +36.558 seconds off the pace of Rachael Atherton's 3:05.135.

2016, Giove was inducted into the Mountain Bike Hall of Fame.

2022, Giove is a main character in the book, Pressure: A Memoir by Eric Canori.

Legal troubles 
1999, May. Giove, along with Amazon Inc. filed a lawsuit against Cannondale (AMAZON, INC. v. CANNONDALE CORP. DIRT CAMP, INC., Civil Action Nos. 99-cv-00571-EWN-PAC, 00-cv-02063-EWN-PAC (D. Colo. March 10, 2006) and Dirt Camp, Inc. for a 1999 Cannondale Product Catolog and sought $2 million dollars in damages. During the summer and early fall of 1998, while Giove was still a member of the team, Cannondale designed, published, and distributed its 1999 products catalog. The catalog included several photographs of Giove. Subsequently, Giove and Team Sports Mountain Inc.(TMSI) failed to renegotiate a contract, and the TSMI/Amazon contract expired on December 31, 1998. Cannondale continued to distribute the 1999 catalog containing Giove's photographs after the TSMI/Amazon contract expired.

2009, June. Giove was arrested in Wilton, New York on charges of conspiring to possess and distribute 384 pounds of marijuana found hidden in a car trailer during a routine traffic stop. The case netted over $12,515,738 assets seized in the conspiracy.

2012, November. Giove, pleaded guilty in the case and was sentenced to 5 years on probation and 6 months under house arrest.

References

"Missy Giove: "The Missile" That Had to Be Stopped". WeLoveCycling magazine. 2017-07-14.
“Missy Giove.” Marin Museum of Bicycling and Mountain Bike Hall of Fame, mmbhof.org/missy-giove/.
Allen, and Christina. “Missy Giove.” 
Browne, David. “SPORTS EXTREMIST.” The New York Times, The New York Times, 19 May 1996, www.nytimes.com/1996/05/19/magazine/sports-extremist.html.

1972 births
Living people
American female cyclists
Downhill mountain bikers
Lesbian sportswomen
LGBT cyclists
American LGBT sportspeople
UCI Mountain Bike World Champions (women)
American mountain bikers
American people of Italian descent
21st-century American women
Cyclists from New York (state)